Justice Bond may refer to:

Carroll Bond, chief justice of the Maryland Court of Appeals
Henry Whitelaw Bond, associate justice of the Supreme Court of Missouri
James A. C. Bond, associate justice of the Maryland Court of Appeals
Nathaniel W. Bond, associate justice of the Louisiana Supreme Court